Kick Axe IV is the fourth studio album by Canadian heavy metal band Kick Axe. The album was released in 2004 after the band reformation in 2003 with original member Gary Langen singing for Criston, who was unavailable to join the reunion due to prior work commitments.

In 2008 Gary Langen left the band and was replaced with new vocalist Daniel Nargang, formerly of the Regina, Saskatchewan, Canada metal band Into Eternity.

Track listing
"Right Now" (Laurel Aura/Larry Gillstrom) - 4:37
"Rockin Daze" (Brian Gillstrom) - 4:21
"Consolation" (Raymond Harvey) - 4:36
"Turn to Stone" (Laurel Aura/Larry Gillstrom) - 3:55
"Do You Know" (Gary Langen/Larry Gillstrom) - 3:56
"Who Knows Ya" (Laurel Aura/Larry Gillstrom) - 4:28
"Woe" (Raymond Harvey) - 3:30
"Time" (Gary Langen/Larry Gillstrom) - 4:25
"Slip Inside My Dream" (Gary Langen) - 4:06
"Who Says" (Gary Langen/Laurel Aura/Larry Gillstrom) - 2:47
"Rock 'n' Roll Dog" (Laurel Aura/Larry Gillstrom) - 3:02
"Black Heart" (Brian Gillstrom/Larry Gillstrom) - 4:37
"City Lights" (Floyd Ray/Larry Gillstrom) - 5:59
"The Only Ones Here" (Victor Langen) - 4:45

Personnel

Band Members
Gary Langen - lead vocals
Larry Gillstrom - lead and rhythm guitars, backing vocals
Raymond Harvey - lead and rhythm guitars, backing vocals
Victor Langen - bass, backing vocals
Brian Gillstrom - drums, backing vocals

Additional Musicians
Laurel Aura - background vocals
Eric Norman - harmonica
T'Narg Ruthra - Hammond organ

Production 
Kick Axe - producer
Larry Gillstrom - executive producer
Larry Gillstrom, Raymond Harvey - engineers
Craig Wadell - mastering
Sean Murphy, A. Andrew Gonzales - cover art

External links 
 
Official Fan website
[ Allmusic page for "IV"]

2004 albums
Kick Axe albums